Waddi is a town in the northern Obock region of Djibouti.

References
Waddi, Djibouti

Populated places in Djibouti